Saturnalia Fossa  is the largest of the series of parallel Veneneian troughs  in the northern hemisphere of the giant asteroid 4 Vesta. It is estimated to be approx.  wide and is at least ; as of early 2012, one end disappeared in shadow and its total length was thus unknown. It is thought to be a shock fractures resulting from the impact that created Veneneia crater, which it is concentric with. It is one of the longer chasms in the Solar System, and is named after the Roman festival of Saturnalia.

See also
Divalia Fossa, the largest of the Rheasilvian troughs.

References

Extraterrestrial valleys
Geological features on main-belt asteroids
Surface features of 4 Vesta